Nguyễn Minh Hằng (born in Hanoi on 7 December 1988), commonly known by her stage name Min, is a Vietnamese V-pop singer and dancer.

She was born in Hanoi in a wealthy family. At age 13, she moved with her family to Germany, where her parents worked for the Vietnamese embassy. Min graduated with a Bachelor's degree from the European University Viadrina and worked for 2 years as a film production specialist and graphic designer in Germany.

In 2012, her family became burdened by debt after some misfortune, and they moved back to Vietnam, where Min had to support them with her job as an editor for a TV channel. As a self-taught dancer, she joined the local St.319 dance group. In 2013, St.319 became a music group, with Min as the lead singer. Her first breakthrough as a singer was with the song "Y.E.U", which topped Vietnamese charts.

Solo career 
In 2016, Min left St.319 to pursue a solo career as a singer. However her songs only had limited success, and Min reached a low in her singing career. With the song "Có em chờ" released in 2017, her music reached critical popularity again. In May of the same year, the song "Ghen", which she sang together with Erik, was released and topped charts.

After an absence of around a year, Min returned in 2019 with the song "Đừng yêu nữa em mệt rồi". In 2020, the song "Ghen Cô Vy", based on Min and Erik's 2017 hit, attracted worldwide attention as it spread awareness about COVID-19 prevention measures. Min also donated "10,000 medical face masks and 500 bottles of hand sanitizers to the National Hospital of Tropical Diseases".

Discography

Studio album

Singles 
As lead artist

As featured artist

Promotional singles

Notes

References 

Living people
1988 births
Vietnamese dancers
Vietnamese pop singers
European University Viadrina alumni